Zephany Nurse (born 28 April 1997) is a South African woman who was abducted from Groote Schuur Hospital in Cape Town, South Africa on 30 April 1997, when she was two days old. Nurse was reunited with her biological parents, Morne and Celeste Nurse, 17 years later after DNA tests confirmed her identity.

Kidnapping 
Celeste Nurse delivered Zephany on 28 April 1997 by caesarean section in the Groote Schuur Hospital, Cape Town, South Africa. Celeste described a person in a nurse's uniform comforting her while her baby was still in the nearby cot, before falling asleep. When Celeste had woken up, a nurse kept asking her where the baby was, and at this point she realized that Zephany had been taken. The hospital contacted the police for assistance in searching the hospital; however only a few untraceable items were found, including Zephany's baby nest, a baby garment, and a handbag with no identifiable items. A pillow was found in a tunnel that was intended to provide direct access to the women in labour to the ward from the street. The tunnel also provided access to the old main building, psychiatric department and out-patient section, which at the time had unrestricted access.

The Nurse family believe the kidnapper took precautions to move through the ward unnoticed. The pillow was probably used to fake a pregnancy, as no one would question a pregnant woman moving around in a maternity ward. The woman, now dressed as a nurse in maroon pants and oatmeal top, made an effort to befriend the mothers in the ward. One of the expectant mothers, who remembered the kidnapper's face, had spoken to her briefly. On another occasion, this same mother found her holding her baby, and when questioned the woman replied that the baby had been crying and she was comforting it. In a later interview Celeste Nurse said: "Her intention was to steal a child, she didn't care which child it was." Five days after Zephany's birth, the Nurse family went home without their daughter.

Search 
Celeste Nurse clung to the hope that what happened was not real, or a kind of sick joke and that someone would bring her daughter. "We came home to nothing." Every year since the kidnapping, the Nurse family would celebrate Zephany's birthday on 28 April, in an attempt to keep the search for her in the media. Celeste has also given a number of interviews, many at times when other kidnappings have occurred, always offering support to the affected families.

In at least two instances the Nurse family were given hope that their daughter would be returned home. One woman, whose neighbors had not noticed her pregnancy, was investigated by the police, but, while the child closely resembled the missing Zephany, it was a boy. In another instance, after almost 12 years of no news, in July 2009, the Nurses received a phone call in which a woman whispered, "I know about your daughter," and asked for 500,000 South African Rand (approx US $70,000 in 2009) to be delivered at a prearranged place. Police were contacted, and the drop off monitored, but no one arrived to collect the money. The call was later traced to Glenda Doubell, a neighbor of Celeste Nurse's mother, who was charged with extortion and was given 3 years house arrest, ZAR 5,000 fine and 600 hours community service.

Finding Zephany 
In January 2015, the Nurses' second daughter, Cassidy Nurse, started at a new school where Zephany, then aged seventeen, coincidentally was also in attendance under the name Miché Solomon. Friends of Zephany commented on the uncanny resemblance between the two girls, and despite their 4-year age difference, they formed an almost immediate friendship. Once Morne Nurse heard about the physical similarities between the two girls, he arranged with Cassidy to meet Zephany at a local takeaway. After this first meeting, Morne contacted the investigating officer in the disappearance of Zephany.

The police began an investigation, and after Zephany's purported parents could not provide proof of her birth, DNA tests were conducted. The results were conclusive that Zephany was the Nurses' child, and she was removed to a place of safety by the Department of Social Services. The Nurse family were granted visitations, and apparently Zephany was already calling them "mother" and "father" at this time.  In March 2016, a woman, who was not named for legal reasons, was convicted of the abduction.  In August 2016, she was sentenced to 10 years in prison; her name was still withheld "to protect the identity she gave to [the] baby."

Identity revealed 
Zephany Nurse, whose other name was kept a secret for five years, applied for the ban restricting the publication of her legal name (Miché Solomon) to be lifted, which was granted by the high court in Pretoria on 13 August 2019. Hours after the ban was lifted, Zephany announced that her book entitled Zephany: Two mothers, one daughter, an astonishing true story would be published. Miché Solomon, as she is now called after the high court ruling on 13 August 2019, dedicated the book to both mothers in an article by Times Live. Her kidnapper was identified as Lavona Solomon. 

Miché struggled to form a relationship with her biological family, and after turning 18, as her biological parents were then divorced, she chose to move back in with the father she had grown up with, who had been absolved of any involvement in her kidnapping. Miché Solomon chose to keep the name that she was raised with, and she says she has forgiven Lavona and regularly visits her in prison. Miché, who now has two children of her own, says she is still living in the family home, waiting for the woman she still refers to as "my mother" to return.

See also 
Abduction of Kamiyah Mobley
Kidnapping of Carlina White
List of kidnappings
List of solved missing person cases

References 

1990s missing person cases
1997 births
1997 in South Africa
2015 in South Africa
Formerly missing people
Kidnappings in South Africa
Kidnapped South African children
Kidnapped South African people
Living people
Missing person cases in Africa
April 1997 events in South Africa